"Ohms" is a song by American alternative metal band Deftones. The song was released as the lead single from the band's ninth studio album Ohms. The song appears on the album as the tenth and final track. It was nominated for Best Rock Performance at the 64th Grammy Awards.

Music video
Deftones released a series of cryptic teasers for a week in mid-August 2020. The teaser campaign ended on August 21, 2020 with the release of the "Ohms" music video; the album's title was also revealed with the video's release. The video was directed by Rafatoon and features the band performing interspersed with scenes of a dystopian world.

Track listing

Charts

Personnel
Chino Moreno – vocals
Stephen Carpenter – guitar
Sergio Vega – bass
Frank Delgado – keyboards
Abe Cunningham – drums

References

External links
Official Music Video on YouTube

2020 songs
2020 singles
Deftones songs
Reprise Records singles
Song recordings produced by Terry Date
Songs written by Chino Moreno
Songs written by Stephen Carpenter
Songs written by Sergio Vega (bassist)
Songs written by Frank Delgado (American musician)
Songs written by Abe Cunningham
Dream pop songs